Dante Alinsunurin is a Filipino volleyball coach.

Career

NU Bulldogs
Alinsunurin has coached in the University Athletic Association of the Philippines (UAAP), mentoring the National University (NU) Bulldogs men's volleyball team which won back-to-back titles over FEU in 2019 and Ateneo in 2018. The Bulldogs, under his watch, also took part at the 2018 ASEAN University Games in Myanmar and clinched a gold medal for the Philippines.

Club
Alinsunurin has participated at the Spikers' Turf as coach. He guided the Megabuilders Volley Bolts in 2017.
He also coached Go for Gold Air Force team which finished as runners-up at the 2021 PNVF Champions League.

He would join the women's club Choco Mucho Flying Titans of the Premier Volleyball League with his first tournament set to be the 2023 All-Filipino Conference.

Philippine national team
Alinsunurin has coached the Philippine men's national team. A former national player himself, Alinsunurin was appointed as head coach in February 2019, under the then national federation Larong Volleyball sa Pilipinas (LVP). He helped the team win a silver medal at the 2019 Southeast Asian Games. He was retained as a coach when the LVP was succeeded by the Philippine National Volleyball Federation in 2021.

He has also coached the national team at the 2021 Asian Men's Club Volleyball Championship which took part as a club side under the name Rebisco PH. In 2022,  Alinsunurin would lead the team again for the 2021 Southeast Asian Games in Vietnam. However the team failed to maintain their success from the 2019 edition, finishing fifth.

In January 2023, Alinsunurin left the national team after he was named coach of Choco Mucho Flying Titans.

References

Filipino volleyball coaches
Volleyball coaches of international teams
Living people
Filipino men's volleyball players
Year of birth missing (living people)